Sree Narayanaguru Open University is a state open university located in Kollam, Kerala, established in 2020 by the government of Kerala. The first open university in Kerala, it was approved by the University Grants Commission (UGC) in 2021. The university consists of regional centres and study centres. It is the only public university in Kerala to offer distance education, with its establishment, all the distance education courses offered by state-run universities—University of Kerala, Mahatma Gandhi University, University of Calicut, and Kannur University came under the administrative control and purview of the new university. The university has been named after Narayana Guru and has its headquarters at Kureepuzha in Kollam.

The university was established by the promulgation of an 45th Ordinance of 2020 to that effect by Hon'ble governor of Kerala on 25 September 2020 and was dedicated to the public by Sri. Pinarayi Vijayan, Chief Minister of Kerala, on 2 October 2020 in a function held at Kollam.

Chancellor
The governor of Kerala is, by virtue of his/her office, the chancellor of the university.

Officers
As per the Ordinance, the following are the officers of the university
The Vice-Chancellor
The Pro-Vice-Chancellor
The Registrar
The Finance Officer
The Controller of Examinations
The Cyber Controller
The Director of School of Studies
The Director of Regional Centres
The Sreenarayanaguru Open University is the first university in Kerala to have a cyber controller as an officer of the university.

The Kerala state government appointed Dr. P M Mubarak Pasha as the first vice-chancellor of the university. At the time of his appointment, Dr Pasha was serving as the Head of Strategic Planning and Governance in the National University of Science and Technology in Oman. The government also appointed Dr. S V Sudheer as the first pro-vice-chancellor, Dr. P N Dileep as the first registrar and Sri. V. Ajayakumar as the first finance officer of the university.

Authorities
The following are the authorities of the university:
The Senate
The Syndicate
The Academic Council
The Finance Council
The Cyber Council
The Board of School of Studies

Schools of study
The university shall have the following schools of study:
School of Humanities and Social Sciences
School of Sciences
School of Languages
School of Law, Business Studies and Development Studies
School of Communications and Information Sciences
School of Interdisciplinary, Multi disciplinary and Transdisciplinary Studies
School of Vocational Education and Training

References

Public universities
Universities in Kerala
Kerala
Open universities in India